The 2000–01 English Premiership (called the Zurich Premiership for sponsorship reasons) was the 14th season of the top flight of the English domestic rugby union competitions.  Leicester Tigers finished top of the league for the third year in a row giving them their fifth English champions title.

This season saw the introduction of the bonus points scoring system.

Additionally, an 8 team end of season knock-out competition, the Zurich Championship was introduced, although this was not used to determine the English Champions, that being the preserve of the Zurich Premiership winners. Leicester also won the Zurich Championship in this season.

Rotherham were relegated, to be replaced by Leeds Tykes for the 2001–02 season.

Participating teams

Table

Results

Week 1

Week 2

Week 3

Week 4

Week 5

Week 6

Week 7

Week 8

Week 9

Week 10

Week 11

Week 12

Week 13

Week 14

Week 15

Week 16

Week 17

Week 18

Week 19

Week 20

Week 21

Zurich Championship 
The top eight teams qualified for the knock-out Zurich Championship, seeded on the basis of their league finish.

Seeding

Quarter–finals

Semi–finals

Final

Leading scorers
Note: Flags to the left of player names indicate national team as has been defined under World Rugby eligibility rules, or primary nationality for players who have not earned international senior caps. Players may hold one or more non-WR nationalities.

Most points 
Source:

Most tries
Source:

Total Season Attendances

References

2000-01
 
England